"Twist and Shout" is the second single from the album Fellow Hoodlums by Scottish rock band Deacon Blue. The song reached No. 10 in the UK Singles Chart in August 1991 and No. 13 on the Irish Singles Chart

Title and release
"Twist and Shout" is not the same song originally performed by the Top Notes. The 12-inch single of Deacon Blue's released contains a live cover of the Beatles' "I'm Down". The single's primary B-side is the song "Good". Some versions of the single include an additional B-side entitled "Golden Bells".

Track listings
All songs written by Ricky Ross, except where noted:

7-inch and cassette single (657302 7; 657302 4)
 "Twist and Shout"
 "Good"

12-inch single (657302 6)
 "Twist and Shout" (extended version)
 "Good"
 "Twist and Shout"
 "I'm Down" (live) (Lennon, McCartney)

CD single (657302 2)
 "Twist and Shout"
 "Good"
 "Golden Bells"

References

Deacon Blue songs
1991 singles
1991 songs
Columbia Records singles
Songs written by Ricky Ross (musician)